The Transcaucasian Commissariat was established at Tbilisi on 11 November 1917, as the first government of the independent Transcaucasia following the October Revolution in Petrograd. The Commissariat decided to strengthen the Georgian–Armenian–Azerbaijani union by convoking a Diet or general assembly (Sejm) in January 1918. It declared independence from Soviet Russia and formed the Transcaucasian Democratic Federative Republic after being faced with the threat of being overrun by the Ottoman invasion.

Decline 
Peace talks were initiated with the Ottoman Empire in March 1918, but broke down quickly as the Ottoman refused to accept the authority of the Commissariat. The Treaty of Brest-Litovsk, which ended Russia's involvement in the First World War, relinquished all Russian claims to parts of the Transcaucasus that prior to the Treaty of San Stefano had been part of the Ottoman Empire, who continued their invasion of the region in order to take control of the territory. Faced with this imminent threat, the Transcaucasian Democratic Federative Republic was proclaimed as an independent state on 22 April 1918. Further negotiations began immediately with the Ottoman, which recognized the state.

See also 
 Special Transcaucasian Committee (OZaKom, Ozakom).
 Transcaucasian Democratic Federative Republic (TDFR, ZKDFR).

References 

1917 establishments in Russia
1918 disestablishments in Russia
Russian Revolution
1917 in Georgia (country)
1910s in Armenia
1910s in Azerbaijan
History of Transcaucasia
Post–Russian Empire states